Ulysses Samuel Lesh (August 9, 1868 - June 5, 1965) was an American lawyer, politician, and novelist who served as the twenty-fourth Indiana Attorney General from January 1, 1921 to January 1, 1925.

Biography

Early life and education
Lesh was born on a farm in Rockcreek Township, Wells County, Indiana to Joseph and Sarah Lesh. Lesh was descended from German immigrants who arrived in America in the early 18th century.

Lesh attended the University of Michigan Law School in Ann Arbor. After graduating in 1891, Lesh moved to Huntington and began to practice law there.

Political career
Lesh, a Republican, served as Huntington's city attorney from 1902 to 1904, and as county attorney for Huntington County from 1907 to 1909.

Lesh served as Assistant Attorney General of Indiana under Ele Stansbury from 1917 to 1921. Lesh was elected to succeed Stansbury to the office of Indiana Attorney General in 1921. Lesh served the bulk of his term as AG in the administration of Republican Governor Warren T. McCray. As Attorney General, Lesh successfully made the Indiana State Fair a state agency. Lesh also submitted a complaint against the Great Lakes Sand Company in the Lake County Circuit Court, asking for an injunction and claiming that the company was liable to pay $50,000 in damages to the State of Indiana for illegally taking sand from Lake Michigan in the counties of Lake, Porter, and LaPorte.

After leaving office, Lesh remained in Indianapolis, practicing law their with two of his sons until 1938. He then moved back to Huntington, practicing law with his younger brother Eben Lesh.

Personal life and death
Lesh married Minnie Fulton in 1894. They had three sons; John, Lex, and Joseph.

Lesh was also an author who published two historical novels. His first novel, A Knight of the Golden Circle (published 1911), focuses on the actions of the secret society, the Knights of the Golden Circle, during the Civil War, and the famous Supreme Court case Ex parte Milligan. His second novel, Three Profiteers (published 1934), doubles as a narrative and an explanation of an economic theory. Running themes between both books include nostalgia for Indiana's pre-industrial era and the erosion of nature and its beauty by human activity and industry. Lesh also wrote The Three Guards, an educational play set during the American Revolution.

Lesh died in 1965.

References

1868 births
1965 deaths
People from Wells County, Indiana
Indiana Attorneys General
Indiana Republicans
20th-century American novelists
University of Michigan Law School alumni
American people of German descent